Dhurong Union is a community in the Fatikchhari Upazila of Chittagong District, on the southeast coastal region of Bangladesh.

Geography
Area:

Location
 North: Kanchan nagar Union
 East:  Rangamatia Union
 South: Daulatpur Union
 West:  Sundarpur Union

Population
At the 1991 Bangladesh census, Dhurong Union had a population of 17,556.

External links
 Dhurong Union details, lcgbangladesh.org

Unions of Fatikchhari Upazila